John Walker FRSE (1731–1803) was a Scottish minister and natural historian. He was Regius Professor of Natural history at the University of Edinburgh from 1779 to 1803. He was joint founder of the Royal Society of Edinburgh in 1783 and Moderator of the General Assembly of the Church of Scotland in 1790.

Overview

Walker was a protégé of the chemist William Cullen and a colleague of Dugald Stewart, Joseph Black and several other Edinburgh professors who shaped the intellectual milieu of the Scottish Enlightenment. During his long career, he became a distinguished botanist, chemist, geologist, hydrologist, meteorologist, mineralogist, zoologist and economic historian, as well as being a minister in the Church of Scotland.

Walker was one of the main scientific consultants of his day, serving as an agricultural, industrial or mining advisor to many influential Scottish landowners, including the judge advocate Lord Kames, George III's prime minister Lord Bute, and Lord Hopetoun. Many of his students went on to become leading scientists in nineteenth century Scotland, England, Ireland, and America. He was a pioneer in introducing agricultural topics into a university curriculum.

As a member of the Philosophical Society of Edinburgh when it received its royal charter, Walker automatically became a Fellow of the Royal Society of Edinburgh in 1783, going on to serve as Secretary of the Society's Physical section (1789–96). He was elected as Moderator of the General Assembly of the Church of Scotland in 1790.

Early life 

He was born in Canongate, Edinburgh the eldest son of John Walker the rector of the Canongate Grammar School, and his wife, Eupham Morison. He was educated at his father's school.

He matriculated at the University of Edinburgh in 1746. Like many aspiring men in Scotland at this time, he took a divinity degree in 1749. He was licensed to preach by the Presbytery of Kirkcudbright in 1754 but was not ordained into the Church of Scotland until 1758, initially being minister of Glencorse just south of Edinburgh, moving to Moffat in 1762 and to Lochmaben. He accepted the post of Professor of Natural History at Edinburgh University in the same year and quickly found the two roles incompatible. In 1783 he returned to the church as minister of Colinton, a parish in south-west Edinburgh. Held in high esteem he was elected Moderator of the General Assembly in 1790. He lived in Colinton manse from 1783 to 1803. He became blind around 1800 but continued to preach until death.

However, his religious duties did not stop him from pursuing scientific subjects in his spare time. While at university took natural philosophy courses and collected natural history specimens in and around the Lothians. During the 1750s he continued to pursue scientific subjects by studying chemistry under Professor William Cullen and by joining Edinburgh's Philosophical Society. He distinguished himself not only by winning awards from the Society but also by publishing an article in the 1757 edition of the Philosophical Transactions of the Royal Society of London. Under Cullen's patronage, Walker further distinguished himself as a chemist and a mineralogist and this led him to function as a scientific advisor for Lord Bute, Lord Hopetoun, Lord Cathcart, and Judge Advocate Lord Kames.

Becoming a naturalist 

During the 1760s he used his aristocratic connections to tour mines throughout the Lowlands and to assemble his own sizeable mineralogical collection. By the mid-1760s, Walker was known as one of Scotland's leading lay naturalists. This motivated the Church of Scotland and the Board of Annexed Estates to send him on exploratory tours of the Highland and Hebrides in 1764 and 1771. These tours allowed him to make religious and ethnographic observations for the church and to take scientifically oriented notes on northern Scotland's minerals, plants, animals, and climate. In his 1764 tour, while on visit to the island of Jura (Deer Island), Walker may have made the first detailed description of the Lyme disease. He gives a good description both of the symptoms (with "exquisite pain [in] the interior parts of the limbs") and of the tick vector itself, which he describes as a "worm" with a body which is "of a reddish colour and of a compressed shape with a row of feet on each side" that "penetrates the skin". It was also during this period that he collected samples of the mineral which came to be known as strontianite from its type locality, thus setting in process the identification and analysis of the new alkaline earth Strontium.

During the 1770s Walker published articles in the Scots Magazine and the Philosophical Transactions. By the mid part of the decade, it became clear that Robert Ramsey, the University of Edinburgh's ailing Professor of Natural History, would soon need to be replaced. After securing the support of William Cullen, Lord Kames and several other politically savvy intellectuals, Walker competed against William Smellie, a well-respected natural historian and influential publisher, for the post. After much wrangling, Walker won the contest and was appointed in 1779. He held the position until his death in 1803.

Later life 

Walker's natural history lectures spanned the academic year and were divided into two sections. The first half of the year he gave his 'Hippocratean' lectures, that is, meteorology, hydrology and geology. The second half of the year was devoted to the three kingdoms of nature: minerals, plants, and animals. During the 1760s, he had accepted Linnaeus' binomial classification system and during his university tenure he readily applied it to botany. However, he did not agree with Linnaeus' classification of minerals and animals and therefore he developed his own unique system for both of these subjects. As shown by Matthew Daniel Eddy, Walker developed a sophisticated theory of the earth based on evidence gathered from geochemistry and human history. Throughout his entire career he kept his ties with the Church of Scotland and in 1790 he was elected to be Moderator, its highest position. Sometime in the late 1790s he began to lose his sight and several of his lectures were taken over by Dr Robert Jameson, a physician and former student who had also studied in mainland Europe. By the time that he died in 1803, Walker had taught well over 800 students, some of whom would go on to have a significant impact on 19th-century natural history. Some of these names include Rev. Prof. John Playfair, Sir James Edward Smith, Sir James Hall, Mungo Park, Robert Waring Darwin, Robert Brown, Thomas Beddoes, Thomas Charles Hope, and Samuel Latham Mitchell.

He died at his Edinburgh home at 1 St John Street on the Canongate on 31 December 1803, and is buried in Canongate Kirkyard on the Royal Mile in Edinburgh, just east of the church building.

Family

In 1789 he married Jane Wallace Wauchope.

See also
 List of Moderators of the General Assembly of the Church of Scotland

References

Further reading

 Eddy, Matthew Daniel, 'Geology, Mineralogy and Time in John Walker's University of Edinburgh Natural History Lectures', History of Science, 39 (2001), 95–119.
 Eddy, Matthew Daniel, 'The University of Edinburgh Natural History Class Lists', Archives of Natural History, 30 (2003), 97–117.
 Matthew Daniel Eddy, The Language of Mineralogy: John Walker, Chemistry and the Edinburgh Medical School, Aldershot: Ashgate Publishing Ltd, 2008, 
 Withers, C. W. J. 'The Rev. Dr John Walker and the practice of natural history in late eighteenth century Scotland', Archives of Natural History, 18 (1991), 201–220.
 Withers, C. W. J. 'A neglected Scottish agriculturalist: The geological lectures and agricultural writings of the Rev. Dr. John Walker (1731–1803)', Agricultural History Review, 1985, 33: 132–146.

External links

1731 births
1803 deaths
18th-century Ministers of the Church of Scotland
18th-century British zoologists
Clergy from Edinburgh
Alumni of the University of Edinburgh
Academics of the University of Edinburgh
Moderators of the General Assembly of the Church of Scotland
Members of the Philosophical Society of Edinburgh
Fellows of the Royal Society of Edinburgh
Burials at the Canongate Kirkyard
People of the Scottish Enlightenment
Scottish mineralogists
Scottish economics writers
Scottish agronomists
Scottish chemists
Scottish botanists
Scottish curators
Scottish geologists
Scottish hydrographers
Scottish meteorologists
Scottish naturalists
Scottish surveyors
Scottish zoologists
18th-century Scottish educators
Scottish blind people
Scientists from Edinburgh
Scientists with disabilities
Blind academics